The 2006 South American Rugby Championship was the 28th edition of the competition of the leading national Rugby Union teams in South America.

The tournament, that was also valid as the final stage of South Americas 2007 Rugby World Cup qualification, wasn't played in a host country, but each of the three countries participating hosted a match.

Argentina won the tournament.

Standings 
 Three point for victory, two for draw, and one for lost 
{| class="wikitable"
|-
!width=165|Team
!width=40|Played
!width=40|Won
!width=40|Drawn
!width=40|Lost
!width=40|For
!width=40|Against
!width=40|Difference
!width=40|Pts
|- bgcolor=#ccffcc align=center
|align=left| 
|2||2||0||0||86||13||+ 73||6
|- align=center
|align=left| 
|2||1||0||1||43||41||+ 2||4
|- align=center
|align=left| 
|2||0||0||2||28||103||- 75||2
|}

Results  
First Round

Second Round

Third Round

References

 IRB – South American Championship 2006

2005
2006 rugby union tournaments for national teams
A
2006 in Argentine rugby union
rugby union
rugby union
International rugby union competitions hosted by Argentina
International rugby union competitions hosted by Chile
International rugby union competitions hosted by Uruguay